John Alexander Magee (October 14, 1827 – November 18, 1903) was a Democratic member of the U.S. House of Representatives from Pennsylvania.

John A. Magee was born in Landisburg, Pennsylvania.  He attended the common schools and was graduated from New Bloomfield Academy.  He engaged in the printing business and for a number of years published the Perry County Democrat.  He was a member of the Pennsylvania State House of Representatives in 1863.  He was a delegate to the Democratic National Convention in 1868, 1876, and 1896.

Magee was elected as a Democrat to the Forty-third Congress.  He was an unsuccessful candidate for renomination in 1874.  He resumed his former business pursuits, and died in New Bloomfield, Pennsylvania, in 1903.  Interment in Bloomfield Cemetery.

Sources

The Political Graveyard

1827 births
1903 deaths
Democratic Party members of the Pennsylvania House of Representatives
Democratic Party members of the United States House of Representatives from Pennsylvania
19th-century American politicians